The Cuban cactus scrub is a xeric shrubland ecoregion that occupies  on the leeward coast of Cuba. Most of it occurs in the southeastern part of the island in the provinces of Guantánamo and Santiago de Cuba. The principal soils are coastal rendzinas that were derived from coralline limestone. Cuban cactus scrub contains four vegetation zones: xerophytic coastal and subcoastal scrubland, coastal thorny semidesert, coastal sclerophyllous scrubland, and rocky coastal scrublands.

Xerophytic coastal and subcoastal scrubland
(Opuntia stricta), O. militaris,  (Harrisia eriophora),  (H. taetra),  (Pilosocereus polygonus),  (Dendrocereus nudiflorus),  (Agave spp.),  (Melocactus spp.) and Leptocereus spp. are typical succulents.

Coastal thorny semidesert
However, succulents represent a smaller proportion of the plant life in this zone.

Coastal sclerophyllous scrubland
The vegetation in this zone is sclerophyllous, meaning that their leaves are hard. This zone represents the transition between xeric shrublands and moister dry forests.

Rocky coastal scrublands
The most sparse and stunted vegetation is found in this zone, which occurs adjacent to the ocean on karstic soil.

Fauna
Birds of the cactus scrub include the Zapata sparrow (Torreornis inexpectata sigmani), Cuban vireo (Vireo gundlachii), Cuban gnatcatcher (Polioptila lembeyei), and Oriente warbler (Teretistris fornsi).  The yellow-striped pygmy eleuth (Eleutherodactylus limbatus) is a species of frog endemic to this ecoregion, while several anole species and the Cuban rock iguana (Cyclura nubila nubila) are endemic lizards.

References

Deserts and xeric shrublands
Ecoregions of the Caribbean
Ecoregions of Cuba

Natural history of Cuba
Neotropical ecoregions